Philip Nichols Jr. (August 11, 1907 – January 26, 1990) was a United States circuit judge of the United States Court of Appeals for the Federal Circuit and previously was a judge of the United States Customs Court and the United States Court of Claims.

Education and career

Born August 11, 1907, in Boston, Massachusetts, Nichols received an Artium Baccalaureus degree in 1929 from Harvard University and a Juris Doctor in 1932 from Harvard Law School. He entered private practice in Boston from 1932 to 1938. He was a special attorney for the Lands Division of the United States Department of Justice from 1938 to 1941. He was a special attorney for the Legal Division of the War Production Board from 1942 to 1944. He was a United States Navy lieutenant commander from 1944 to 1946. He was assistant general counsel for the United States Department of the Treasury from 1947 to 1951. He was general counsel for the Renegotiation Board from 1951 to 1954. He returned to private practice in Washington, D.C. from 1954 to 1961. He was Commissioner of Customs for the United States Department of the Treasury from 1961 to 1964.

Federal judicial service

Nichols was nominated by President Lyndon B. Johnson on June 16, 1964, to a seat on the United States Customs Court vacated by Judge Irvin Charles Mollison. He was confirmed by the United States Senate on September 15, 1964, and received his commission on September 15, 1964. His service terminated on November 30, 1966, due to his elevation to the Court of Claims.

Nichols was nominated by President Johnson on October 6, 1966, to the United States Court of Claims, to a new seat authorized by 80 Stat. 139. He was confirmed by the Senate on October 21, 1966, and received his commission on November 3, 1966. He was reassigned by operation of law to the United States Court of Appeals for the Federal Circuit on October 1, 1982, to a new seat authorized by 96 Stat. 25. He assumed senior status on October 1, 1983. His service terminated on Friday, January 26, 1990, due to his death from heart attack at Georgetown University Hospital in Washington, D.C.

References

Sources
 
 

1907 births
1990 deaths
Judges of the United States Court of Claims
Judges of the United States Court of Appeals for the Federal Circuit
United States Navy officers
Lawyers from Boston
Harvard Law School alumni
Judges of the United States Customs Court
United States federal judges appointed by Lyndon B. Johnson
20th-century American judges
Commissioners of the United States Customs Service
Harvard College alumni